3 Years Hollow is an American rock band from the Quad Cities on the border of the US states of Iowa and Illinois.  In 2014, the ensemble reached No. 23 on Top Heatseekers with studio album The Cracks.  In 2014–2015, the group had two Top 40 singles on Billboard's Mainstream Rock chart.  The group promoted The Cracks by touring with Sevendust, Nonpoint, Eye Empire, Saving Abel, Red, Gemini Syndrome, and Islander in 2014–2015.  They were also part of the 2014 Rockstar Uproar Festival, with bands: Godsmack, Seether, Skillet, Pop Evil, Escape The Fate, and Buckcherry.

Discography

Studio albums

Extended plays 
 Remember (2012)

Singles

References 

Hard rock musical groups from Illinois
Rock music groups from Indiana